Jiang Yuyan (born 2 November 2004) is a Chinese Paralympic swimmer who competes in international level events. She was one of the youngest swimmers to participate in the 2019 World Para Swimming Championships where she won three gold medals and two bronze medals. She won the gold medal at the Women's 50m Butterfly S6 event at the 2020 Summer Paralympics with a world record of 34.56.

Jiang lost her right arm and leg after she was involved in a car accident when she was four years old.

References

2004 births
Living people
Sportspeople from Shaoxing
Paralympic swimmers of China
Medalists at the World Para Swimming Championships
Chinese amputees
Swimmers at the 2020 Summer Paralympics
Medalists at the 2020 Summer Paralympics
Paralympic medalists in swimming
Paralympic gold medalists for China
Paralympic silver medalists for China
Chinese female freestyle swimmers
Chinese female backstroke swimmers
Chinese female butterfly swimmers
S6-classified Paralympic swimmers
21st-century Chinese women
Medalists at the 2018 Asian Para Games